Greek Council for Refugees is a human rights organization founded in 1989. In November 2021 it released a report with Oxfam criticizing Greece's policies of immigration detention.

References

1989 establishments in Greece
Human rights organisations based in Greece
Refugee aid organizations in Europe